HMCS Sault Ste. Marie was a reciprocating engine-powered  built for the Royal Canadian Navy during the Second World War. Entering service in 1943, the minesweeper was used as a convoy escort in the Battle of the Atlantic. Following the war, the minesweeper saw service as a training vessel before being scrapped in 1960.

Design and description
The ships' complement consisted of 85 officers and ratings.

The reciprocating ships had two vertical triple-expansion steam engines, each driving one shaft, using steam provided by two Admiralty three-drum boilers.

The Algerine class was armed with a QF  Mk V anti-aircraft gun and four twin-gun mounts for Oerlikon 20 mm cannon. The latter guns were in short supply when the first ships were being completed and they often got a proportion of single mounts. By 1944, single-barrel Bofors 40 mm mounts began replacing the twin 20 mm mounts on a one for one basis. All of the ships were fitted for four throwers and two rails for depth charges. Many Canadian ships omitted their sweeping gear in exchange for a 24-barrel Hedgehog spigot mortar and a stowage capacity for 90+ depth charges.

Construction and career
When ordered, the ship was intended to be named The Soo, but the name was changed after the city she was named for, Sault Ste. Marie, Ontario, objected. The ship was renamed Sault Ste. Marie and was laid down on 27 January 1942 by Port Arthur Shipbuilding Co. Ltd in Port Arthur, Ontario. The ship was launched on 5 August 1942 and commissioned into the Royal Canadian Navy at Port Arthur on 24 June 1943, the first of the Canadian Algerines.

After commissioning the minesweeper sailed up the St. Lawrence River, making her way to Halifax, Nova Scotia. Sault Ste. Marie then proceeded to Bermuda to work up and upon her return, joined the Western Escort Force escort group W-9 for convoy escort duties in the Battle of the Atlantic. The minesweeper took the position of Senior Officer Ship upon joining the group. As Senior Officer Ship, the commander of the escort would be aboard her during convoy missions.

Sault Ste. Marie remained a part of escort group W-9 until mid-April 1945 when she transferred to group W-7, retaining the position of Senior Officer Ship with the new group. W-7 was disbanded in June 1945, after which the minesweeper was placed in reserve at Sydney, Nova Scotia.

After a short period, Sault Ste. Marie was transferred to the West Coast, arriving at Esquimalt, British Columbia on 12 December 1945. A month later on 12 January 1946, the minesweeper was paid off into the reserve again. On 7 May 1949, the ship was recommissioned as a training ship. She was assigned to  until the end of 1954. In mid-December 1955, she returned to the East Coast, joining the Eleventh Canadian Escort Squadron at Halifax. The minesweeper was used as a training vessel during the summers from 1956 to 1958 on the Great Lakes. On 1 October 1958 Sault Ste. Marie was paid off. She was taken to Sorel where the ship was broken up in 1960.

The 4-inch gun of Sault Ste. Marie can be found outside the Royal Canadian Legion in Sault Ste. Marie.

References

Bibliography

External links 
 Haze Gray and Underway
 ReadyAyeReady.com

Algerine-class minesweepers of the Royal Canadian Navy
Ships built in Ontario
1942 ships
World War II minesweepers of Canada
World War II escort ships of Canada